Several special routes of U.S. Route 95 exist. In order from south to north they are as follows.

Existing

Las Vegas business loop

U.S. Route 95 Business is cosigned with SR 599 (Rancho Drive) in Las Vegas, Nevada. This distinction is noted on US 95 freeway signs and many maps (including those published by the Nevada Department of Transportation). However, no business route signs are posted along the highway itself and relatively few SR 599 shields can be found on the route.

Hawthorne truck route

U.S. Route 95 Truck (US 95 Truck) is a truck route of US 95 in Mineral County, Nevada, in the United States. It serves as a bypass route for trucks taking US 95 past Hawthorne in either direction, as US 95 itself goes through that community. The route is co-designated as State Route 362 (SR 362); however, that designation is unsigned.

Schurz–Fernley alternate route

U.S. Route 95 Alternate (Alternate US 95, US 95A) is an alternate route of U.S. Route 95 located in the western part of Nevada. It connects Schurz to Interstate 80 via the cities of Yerington and Fernley.

Payette spur

U.S. Route 95 Spur is a 1.403 mile spur route of U.S. Route 95 in the U.S. state of Idaho that connects travelers from US 95 to the city center of Payette.

US-95 Spur starts at its terminus with US-95 in the southern part of the city of Payette and travels northward along S. Main Street Approximately  then continues a short distance on S 7th St to its terminus at State Highway 52.

This was the original routing of US 95 through downtown Payette before it was rerouted to its current alignment east of downtown along 16th Street.

Weiser spur

U.S. Route 95 Spur (US 95 Spur) is a short spur route of US 95 in the U.S. states of Oregon and Idaho. The highway's western terminus is at an intersection with Oregon Route 201 (OR 201) in unincorporated Weiser Junction, Oregon. The highway's eastern terminus is in Weiser, Idaho, at an intersection with US 95. It was formed ca. 1980, when it was renumbered from US 30N.

The Oregon section of US 95 Spur is designated the Weiser Spur No. 491 (see Oregon highways and routes).

The route now known as US 95 Spur was previously known as US 630 and US 30N. US 630 was an east–west United States highway. It was decommissioned in or around 1931. It was concurrent with US 30N for its entire length. An earlier route numbered US-630 was proposed from Echo, Utah (northeast of Coalville) to Ogden, Utah, but was never signed in the field. U.S. Route 30N was a split route off of US 30 and was coterminous with US 630 at its west end in Oregon. East of Weiser, it was concurrent with what is now US-95 to Fruitland, Idaho, where it reconnected with US-30.

Former

San Luis truck route

The route was originally established by the Arizona Department of Transportation (ADOT) on November 16, 1984. US 95 Truck began at the San Luis border gate at A Street (now Urtuzuastegu Street) and traveled north on 1st Street, before turning west onto D Street, ending at the intersection with US 95 (Main Street) and D Street. In 2015, US 95 truck was retired after US 95 was reconfigured into a one-way pair around downtown San Luis. Former US 95 Truck is now entirely one-way in a northbound direction and has been replaced by northbound US 95 proper.

Las Vegas alternate route

U.S. Route 95 Alternate (Alternate US 95, US 95A) was an alternate route of U.S. Route 95 in Las Vegas, Nevada that provided a bypass of the downtown area. The route was also designated as State Route 5C, a branch of State Route 5.

St. Maries, ID alternate route

U.S. Route 95 Alternate (Alternate US 95, US 95A) was an alternate route of U.S. Route 95 in northern Idaho that traveled on the east side of Lake Coeur d'Alene. It began at Potlatch and travels east to Harvard and north through St. Maries to a junction with U.S. Route 10 near Wolf Lodge. It was replaced with various state highways, including SH-6, SH-3, and SH-97.

References

External links
 Endpoints of historic U.S. Highway 630

95
U.S. Route 95
95
95
95
95